Tome Torihama (鳥濱 トメ) (June 20, 1902 – April 22, 1992）was the owner of a restaurant called "Tomiya Shokudo" in Kagoshima that served kamikaze pilots before they flew off to war. She is called the "Mother of Kamikazes".

Career 
Torihama was born in Kagoshima prefecture on June 20, 1902. When she turned 18, she married Yoshkiyo Torihama. They had two daughters, Miako and Reiko.

In 1929 Torihama opened the Tomiya Shokudo. When the Chiran Airbase opened in 1942, the Tomiya Shokudo became the designated dining hall for the soldiers living on the base. After the Japanese Special Attack Units were formed in 1945, many of the kamikaze pilots would visit Torihama's restaurant. She became close with many of the young pilots, and would send their final letters to their families for them.

After the war ended, the Supreme Commander of Allied Powers requested to patronize Torihama's restaurant, but she refused. However, when the town had a welcome party for the SCAP at the Tomiya Shokudo, Torihama became close with the American soldiers, some of whom called her "Mama-san".

In 1952, Torihama opened the Tomiya Ryokan for family members visiting graves of fallen Japanese soldiers. In 1955, she built a temple dedicated to the soldiers. In 1975 until her death, Torihama dedicated her life to the Chiran Peace Museum for Kamikaze Pilots.

Torihama died of heart failure in 1992. After her death, many movies, plays, and books were made about her life. There were two monuments erected in her honor, one in 1981 and one in 2007.

Further reading

References

External links 
 

1992 deaths
1902 births
Kamikaze
People from Kagoshima Prefecture
History of Kagoshima Prefecture